XETVH-AM is a radio station on 1230 AM in Cunduacán, Tabasco, serving Villahermosa. It is part of the state government's Radio and Television Commission (CORAT) and is known as La Radio de Tabasco.

XETVH heads a four-station network of stations, two on AM and two on FM, with the same programming.

History
XETVH came to air in 1983 and XETQE in 1998. XHVET-FM and XHJON-FM were awarded in 2011 alongside XHTQE-FM.

Transmitters

References

External links
La Radio de Tabasco Facebook

Public radio in Mexico
Radio stations in Tabasco